TKR College of Engineering and Technology (TKRCET) is an autonomous college located in Meerpet, near LB Nagar, Hyderabad, Telangana, India. The college is affiliated with Jawaharlal Nehru Technological University (JNTU) in Hyderabad. It received its autonomous status in 2017.

Location 
TKR College of Engineering and Technology is located amidst the semi-urban locality of Meerpet in southern Hyderabad, covering more than 20 acres of land.

90N/R, 100, 104D, 104J, 104R and 104S are a few RTC buses which pass by near the main gate of the campus. It is one of the closest engineering colleges from central Hyderabad. About two-thirds of the students travel by RTC buses while the remaining use their own vehicles or the college bus services.

Courses offered 
The institute offers engineering degree programs with the approval of the government of India and with affiliation to Jawaharlal Nehru Technological University, Hyderabad. All B.Tech programs are NBA accredited.

Programs offered are:  
Undergraduate courses
 Computer Science and Engineering
 Electronics and Communication Engineering
 Electrical and Electronics Engineering 
 Mechanical Engineering
 Civil Engineering
 Information Technology
 Humanities and Sciences
Computer Science and Engineering( in AI &ML)
Computer Science and Engineering (in DS)

Infrastructure 
The campus of TKR College of Engineering and Technology is shared by Teegala Krishna Reddy Engineering College (TKREC), Teegala Krishna Reddy College of Pharmacy (TKRCOP) and TKR Institute of Management & Studies (TKRIMS).

A cricket ground hosts district-level tournaments as well as music releases and promotional events but is usually restricted from use by students. Other on-campus sports facilities include basketball, volleyball, table tennis and carroms.

Admissions  
The college admits undergraduates and postgraduates. Undergraduate students are admitted through the statewide EAMCET examination for intermediate students and diploma students through TS ECET. Postgraduate students through GATE and ICET, which are conducted every year. Apart from EAMCET, TSECET, GATE, and ICET exams, students are also admitted through B-Category (selection based on JEE (Mains), EAMCET ranks and NRI quota.

Placement cell 
The Training and Placement cell was established with a prime objective of creating career opportunities for promising TKR students in reputed corporations towards meeting aspirations of all the stakeholders. To accomplish this career objective placement cell has identified corporations in various sectors and initiated the process of building a mutually rewarding relationship with them.
College having Average placements record

Gallery 

Ankit Tiwari, one of the well-known singers in India had performed in the college's cultural event "Shiznay 2K17".
Arijit Singh, one of the well-known singers in India had performed in the college's cultural event "Shiznay 2K16".

References

External links
 TKR College of Engineering and Technology

Engineering colleges in Hyderabad, India
2002 establishments in Andhra Pradesh
Educational institutions established in 2002